Vernon Valley may refer to:

Vernon Valley, New Jersey
Vernon Valley, former name and current neighborhood of Northport, New York
Vernon Valley, former name for part of Mountain Creek ski resort